Kelly Le Fave (born 1959) is an American poet.

Childhood and personal life
Le Fave was born in Washington, D.C. and grew up in Virginia and Maryland.  She has also spent time living in Western Massachusetts.  She lives in Portland, Oregon with her husband and two children.

Publications
Her poems have appeared in Tin House, Image, The Notre Dame Review, Painted Bride Quarterly, The Massachusetts Review and other journals.

Her book manuscript Me Comma You won the 2002 Gibbs-Smith Poetry Prize, and was published by Gibbs Smith.

Editing
Le Fave is a founding editor of the internationally distributed literary journal jubilat.

Education
Kelly Le Fave is a graduate of the MFA Program for Poets & Writers at the University of Massachusetts Amherst (1999).  She received her BA from the University of Virginia in 1981.  She also holds an MA in English Language and Literature from Syracuse University (1990).

Teaching
She has taught writing at Syracuse University, the University of Massachusetts Amherst, and the University of Utah.

External links
Kelly Le Fave at Image Journal
Kelly Le Fave at Gibbs Smith

Living people
1959 births
University of Massachusetts Amherst faculty
American women poets
University of Massachusetts Amherst MFA Program for Poets & Writers alumni
University of Virginia alumni
Syracuse University alumni
American women academics
21st-century American women